PS Duchess of Richmond was a passenger vessel built for the London and South Western Railway and London, Brighton and South Coast Railway in 1910.

History

The ship was built by D and W Henderson of Glasgow and launched on 11 June 1910. She was constructed for a joint venture between the London and South Western Railway and the London, Brighton and South Coast Railway for the passenger trade to the Isle of Wight.

On 25 June 1911 she collided with the pinnace of the Swedish warship Flygia which was bringing men ashore on leave. The pinnace was smashed and the crew thrown into the water, but all were rescued.

She was requisitioned by the Admiralty as HMS Duchess of Richmond a minesweeper during the First World War. On 28 June 1919 she struck a mine and sank in the Aegean Sea.

References

1910 ships
Steamships of the United Kingdom
Paddle steamers of the United Kingdom
Ships built on the River Clyde
Ships of the London and South Western Railway
Ships of the London, Brighton and South Coast Railway
Maritime incidents in 1919
Ships sunk by mines